The Magic Machines is a 1969 American short documentary film directed by Bob Curtis about kinetic artist Robert Gilbert. It won an Oscar at the 42nd Academy Awards in 1970 for Academy Award for Best Live Action Short Film and was nominated for Academy Award for Best Documentary (Short Subject).

Cast
 Robert Gilbert

References

External links

The Magic Machines on YouTube
Homepage of Robert Gilbert

1969 films
1969 independent films
1969 short films
1969 documentary films
American short documentary films
American independent films
1960s short documentary films
Live Action Short Film Academy Award winners
1960s English-language films
1960s American films